Tum Saath Ho Jab Apne (English:When you're with us) is a series broadcast on Sony Pal by Sphere Origins. The concept of the show brings forward the story of a daughter who achieves her dreams against all odds and a mother who nurtures her daughters dream in the face of all possible social pressures and hurdles.

Plot

Mariam is a widowed wife of Tauseef who was a badminton player. She lives with her in-laws and young daughter, Najma who is clever to play tennis and badminton like her father. Mariam helps her secretly. But, Tauseef's elder brother, Younis tries to stop it. He wants to teach badminton to his son, Waqar instead of Najma because she is a girl. However, A tennis coach named Imran comes to Mariam and Tauseef's former house as a neighbor. He is drunkard because of his daughter's untimely death. Much to Najma's surprise, He starts to work as a tennis coach at Najma's school.

Eventually, Imran notices the Najma's talent and helps her to join the school team. But, Najma refuses it because of Mariam's advice. Imran makes Mariam to understand Najma's talent. Mariam permits Najma to train with Imran.

Soon, Younis learns that Najma is training with Imran and warns Najma to leave sports. Mariam takes a stand for Najma and conflict arises. After that, Imran comes to control the situation but Younis argues with him. In their argument, Imran tells that he had fallen for Mariam already and he will marry her. Mariam gets shocked and her in-laws agrees to marriage. Finally, Imran and Mariam get married.

Cast

Main
Barkha Bisht Sengupta as Mariam Baig – Tauseef's widow; Imran's wife; Najma's mother
Ashnoor Kaur as Najma Baig – Tauseef and Mariam's daughter; Imran's tennis student and adopted daughter 
Hasan Zaidi as Imran Siddiqui – Mariam's husband; Najma's tennis coach and adopted father
Khalid Siddiqui as Tauseef Baig – Salman's younger son; Younis' brother; Mariam's late husband; Najma's father

Recurring
Aasif Sheikh as Younis Baig – Salman's elder son; Tauseef's brother; Nasima's husband; Sabah, Waqar and Fiza's father
Parul Chaudhary as Nasima Baig – Younis's wife; Sabah, Waqar and Fiza's mother
Pallavi Gupta as Sabah Baig – Younis and Nasima's elder daughter; Waqar and Fiza's sister
Rakshit Wahi as Waqar Baig – Younis and Nasima's son; Sabah and Fiza's brother
Divya as Fiza Baig – Younis and Nasima's younger daughter; Sabah and Waqar's sister
S. M. Zaheer as Salman Baig – Younis and Tauseef's father; Sabah, Waqar, Najma and Fiza's grandfather
Amita Udgata as Rahamat Khala – Caretaker of Baig Family
Anup Upadhyay as Jamaal – Salman's son-in-law
Mohit Abrol as Ayaan – Sabah's love interest

References 

Parenting television series
2014 Indian television series debuts
2014 Indian television series endings
Hindi-language television shows
Sony Pal original programming
Television shows set in Uttar Pradesh